Tekirdağ Namık Kemal University (Turkish: Tekirdağ Namık Kemal Üniversitesi) is a public university in Tekirdağ, Turkey. The university was founded 2006 under the administration of the Trakya University Rectorate Enver Duran. The Faculty of Agriculture, opened in 1982 and the Çorlu Faculty of Engineering was founded in 1992.

The university has eleven faculties, three institutes, twelve vocational schools and a school of health, with nearly 30,000 students, more than 1100 academic staff and 200 administrative staff.

The university is a member of the Balkan Universities Network, and was named after the prominent Turkish nationalist and intellectual Namık Kemal.

See also
List of universities in Turkey
List of colleges and universities
List of colleges and universities by country

External links
 Webpage of Tekirdağ Namık Kemal University

References

State universities and colleges in Turkey
Universities and colleges in Turkey
Educational institutions established in 2006
Tekirdağ
Buildings and structures in Tekirdağ Province
2006 establishments in Turkey